Badamestan-e Bala (also Romanized as Bādāmestān-e Bālā; also known as Bādāmestān) is a village in Madvarat Rural District, in the Central District of Shahr-e Babak County, Kerman Province, Iran. At the 2006 census, its population was 119, in 33 families.

References 

Populated places in Shahr-e Babak County